Don't Sweat the Technics is the debut studio album by American electronic music artist Kid606. Recorded by Kid606 between the ages 17 to 18, the album was issued on CD format through the independent San Francisco-based label Vinyl Communications in 1998. The album would later catch the attention of Mike Patton, operator of Ipecac Recordings, who subsequently signed Kid606 to Ipecac.

The album is noted for its noisy sound, mostly rooting itself in glitch and breakcore music. Influences for the album range from Atari Teenage Riot to The Locust. The album was reissued as a double CD set in 2011; the second disc comprised material released in the form of split albums.

Track listing

References

External links
 Vinyl Communications webpage

1998 debut albums
Kid606 albums